Brown Island is a small, brown, almost snow-free island in the southeastern part of the Wauwermans Islands,  southwest of Wednesday Island, in the Wilhelm Archipelago. It was charted by the British Graham Land Expedition under John Rymill, 1934–37, and so named because its brown color distinguished it from adjacent snow-capped islands.

See also 
 List of Antarctic and sub-Antarctic islands

References 

Islands of the Wilhelm Archipelago